Augustus Sander House, also known as the Jacob and Annie Koch House and Frederich and Anna Brandt House is a historic home located at Cole Camp, Benton County, Missouri. It was built about 1861, and is a -story, single-pen frame dwelling with a side gable roof.  It has a wide rear ell added about 1875 and expanded about 1919, and a one-story front porch added about 1893.

It was listed on the National Register of Historic Places in 2004.

References

Houses on the National Register of Historic Places in Missouri
Houses completed in 1902
Buildings and structures in Benton County, Missouri
National Register of Historic Places in Benton County, Missouri